Hyun-hee, also spelled Hyun-hui, Hyon-hui or Hyon-hi, is a Korean unisex given name, predominantly feminine. Its meaning differs based on the hanja used to write each syllable of the name. There are 35 hanja with the reading "hyun" and 24 hanja with the reading "hee" on the South Korean government's official list of hanja which may be registered for use in given names.

People with this name include:
Kim Hyon-hui (born 1962), North Korean female agent responsible for the Korean Air Flight 858 bombing in 1987
Na Hyun-hee (born 1970), South Korean actress
Nam Hyun-hee (born 1981), South Korean female foil fencer
Hong Hyun-hee (born 1982), South Korean female basketball player
Joo Hyun-hee (born 1982), South Korean female badminton player
Hong Hyun-hui (born 1991), South Korean female tennis player
Yun Hyon-hi (born 1992), North Korean female football forward
Han Hyun-hee (born 1993), South Korean male baseball pitcher
Kim Hyon-hui (table tennis), North Korean female table tennis player

See also
List of Korean given names

References

Korean unisex given names